Michael Ray Durrette (born August 11, 1957 in Charlottesville, Virginia) is a former offensive lineman in the NFL. He played for the Los Angeles Express in the USFL, and the San Francisco 49ers in the NFL. He was drafted in the 1986 NFL Draft out of West Virginia.

References

1957 births
Living people
West Virginia Mountaineers football players
American football offensive linemen
San Francisco 49ers players
Players of American football from Virginia
Los Angeles Express players
Sportspeople from Charlottesville, Virginia
National Football League replacement players